Nibok is a district in the island nation of Nauru in the Micronesian South Pacific. It is located in the west of the island and covers an area of 1.6 square kilometres (395 acres). Nibok is a part of the Ubenide Constituency. As of 2011, the population was 484.

The NPC field workshops are located in Nibok.

Education

Nibok Infant School is in Nibok. The primary and secondary schools serving all of Nauru are Yaren Primary School in Yaren District (years 1–3), Nauru Primary School in Meneng District (years 4–6), Nauru College in Denigomodu District (years 7–9), and Nauru Secondary School (years 10–12) in Yaren District.

See also
Geography of Nauru
List of settlements in Nauru
Rail transport in Nauru

References

External links

Districts of Nauru
Populated places in Nauru